Coleophora hydrella is a moth of the family Coleophoridae. It is found in Pakistan.

References

hydrella
Moths described in 1994
Moths of Asia